The 15th Annual Interactive Achievement Awards is the 15th edition of the Interactive Achievement Awards, an annual awards event that honors the best games in the video game industry. It was also held as part of the Academy's 2012 D.I.C.E. Summit, and was hosted by stand up comedian Jay Mohr. It would be the final year that it would be called the Interactive Achievement Awards.

The Elder Scrolls V: Skyrim won the most awards, including Game of the Year. Uncharted 3: Drake's Deception received the most nominations.

Tim Sweeney, founder of  Epic Games and creator of the Unreal Engine, received the of the Academy of Interactive Arts & Sciences Hall of Fame Award. Ed Logg, game designer behind Atari classics such as Asteroids, Super Breakout, and Centipede, received of the Pioneer Award.

Winners and Nominees
Winners are listed first, highlighted in boldface, and indicated with a double dagger.

Special Awards

Hall of Fame
 Tim Sweeney

Pioneer
 Ed Logg

Games with multiple nominations and awards

The following 16 games received multiple nominations:

The following three games received multiple awards:

Companies with multiple nominations

Companies that received multiple nominations as either a developer or a publisher.

Companies that received multiple awards as either a developer or a publisher.

External links

References

2012 awards
2012 awards in the United States
February 2012 events in the United States
2011 in video gaming
D.I.C.E. Award ceremonies